Orchestina elegans is a species of spiders in the family Oonopidae. It is found in the Philippines.

References

External links 
 Orchestina elegans at the World Spider Catalog

Oonopidae
Spiders described in 1893
Spiders of Asia
Arthropods of the Philippines